The Festival of Festivals (Festival delle Sagre in Italian) is an event that celebrates the customs and traditions of country life: it takes place in Asti during the "Settembre Astigiano", in the Piedmont region of Italy, over the weekend of the second Sunday in September each year. Festival Delle Sagre D’Asti is one of three main September events, the others being the Douja d'Or national wine show and the Palio of Asti that runs on the third Sunday of September. By established tradition it begins on Saturday night and runs all day Sunday: however, the Saturday evening event usually attracts the higher number of visitors. Over the course of two days, the festival attracts about 200,000 visitors each year.

The Sunday event starts with a colourful parade that winds through the streets of the city, depicting rural values and traditions of the province with more than 3,000 characters in authentic period costumes.

History

The beginnings of the festival of Festivals can be traced to an idea of Giovanni Borello, president of the Chamber of Commerce of Asti, in 1974: his plan was to augment the Douja d'Or, essentially a wine competition, with a festival celebrating a bygone rural world. The organisers particularly stressed the gastronomic aspect of the event, presenting in one place the various local dishes of the area, complementing the local wines.

The COVID-19 pandemic called off the festival in 2020-21.

Food and wine fair
The Festival delle Sagre features Italy's largest open-air restaurant, offering a variety of authentic Piedmont cuisine. More than 40 Pro Loco organizations of the Province of Asti present their specialties, accompanied by Asti DOC and DOCG wines, from stalls set up in Asti's large, central 'Campo del Palio' square, arranged to re-create an old village atmosphere.

Both written and oral recipes created by generations of rural people are used each year to present a menu of over eighty different dishes, prepared using ingredients that are typical for the Asti region. Some are unusual, such as rice with Barbera d'Asti, Polenta with wild boar stew, rabbit agnolotti, fried bleak (alborelle - a type of fish), farinata (belecauda in Asti dialect of the Piedmontese language) or bollitto with bagnetto verde. Some dishes are prepared in almost industrial quantities - in 2004 over 4,000 kg of rabbit agnolotti were consumed - and are sold at affordable prices.

The parade
On Sunday morning, a long procession files through the Asti streets, based on the theme of country life up to the early twentieth century. The parade includes more than 3000 characters in authentic period clothing, work tools, furnishings and fixtures of all kinds, antique tractors, agricultural machines, wagons and tractors, plus a domestic zoo with various oxen, horses, mules, donkeys and other animals. The procession recreates scenes of peasant life, punctuated by the changing seasons, organized to resemble a living museum.

The procession winds through the streets of downtown for about two hours, and culminates with the food and wine fair which runs from noon until the evening.

References

External links

Information website
Official website
coordinates: 

Asti
Food and drink festivals in Italy
Tourist attractions in Piedmont